C97 may refer to: 
 Ruy Lopez chess openings ECO code
 Malignant neoplasms of independent (primary) multiple sites ICD-10 code
 Lowell Airport (Indiana), in Indiana FAA LID
 Migration for Employment Convention (Revised), 1949 ILO code

C-97 may refer to:
 C-97 Stratofreighter, an aircraft